The 2016–17 Campeonato Nacional de Futebol Feminino, also known as Liga Futebol Feminino Allianz for sponsorship reasons, is the 32nd edition of the top division of the Portugal women's football championship. It started on 10 September 2016 and ended on 28 May 2017.

Teams

League table

Results

Season statistics

Top scorers
As of Week 19

Best goalkeepers
As of Week 10

Hat-tricks
As of Week 10

4 Player scored 4 goals 
5 Player scored 5 goals 
8 Player scored 8 goals

References

External links
official website (fpf)
soccerway

2016-17
Por
women's
Camp|